The 2003–04 Northern Football League season was the 106th in the history of Northern Football League, a football competition in England.

Division One

Division One featured 18 clubs which competed in the division last season, along with three new clubs, promoted from Division Two:
 Horden Colliery Welfare
 Penrith
 Thornaby

League table

Division Two

Division Two featured 16 clubs which competed in the division last season, along with four new clubs.
 Clubs relegated from Division One:
 Consett
 Newcastle Blue Star
 Prudhoe Town
 Plus:
 Newcastle Benfield Saints, joined from the Northern Football Alliance

League table

References

External links
 Northern Football League official site

Northern Football League seasons
2003–04 in English football leagues